In theoretical physics, thermal quantum field theory  (thermal field theory for short) or finite temperature field theory is a set of methods to calculate expectation values of physical observables of a quantum field theory at finite temperature.

In the Matsubara formalism, the basic idea (due to Felix Bloch) is that the expectation values of operators in a canonical ensemble

may be written as expectation values in ordinary quantum field theory where the configuration is evolved by an imaginary time . One can therefore switch to a spacetime with Euclidean signature, where the above trace (Tr) leads to the requirement that all bosonic and fermionic fields be periodic and antiperiodic, respectively, with respect to the Euclidean time direction with periodicity  (we are assuming natural units ). This allows one to perform calculations with the same tools as in ordinary quantum field theory, such as functional integrals and Feynman diagrams, but with compact Euclidean time.  Note that the definition of normal ordering has to be altered.
In momentum space, this leads to the replacement of continuous frequencies by discrete imaginary (Matsubara) frequencies  and, through the de Broglie relation, to a discretized thermal energy spectrum .  This has been shown to be a useful tool in studying the behavior of quantum field theories at finite temperature.

It has been generalized to theories with gauge invariance and was a central tool in the study of a conjectured deconfining phase transition of Yang–Mills theory.
In this Euclidean field theory, real-time observables can be retrieved by analytic continuation. The Feynman rules for gauge theories in the Euclidean time formalism, were derived by C. W. Bernard.    

The Matsubara formalism, also referred to as imaginary time formalism, can be extended to systems with thermal variations. In this approach, the variation in the temperature is recast as a variation in the Euclidean metric. Analysis of the partition function leads to an equivalence between thermal variations and the curvature of the Euclidean space.

The alternative to the use of fictitious imaginary times is to use a real-time formalism which come in two forms.  A path-ordered approach to real-time formalisms includes the Schwinger–Keldysh formalism and more modern variants.
In fact all that is needed is one section running along the real time axis, as the route to the end point, is less important.
The piecewise composition of the resulting complex time contour leads to a doubling of fields and more complicated Feynman rules, but obviates the need of analytic continuations of the imaginary-time formalism. The alternative approach to real-time formalisms is an operator based approach using Bogoliubov transformations, known as thermo field dynamics.
As well as Feynman diagrams and perturbation theory, other techniques such as dispersion relations and the finite temperature analog of Cutkosky rules can also be used in the real time formulation.

An alternative approach which is of interest to mathematical physics is to work with KMS states.

See also
 Matsubara frequency
 Polyakov loop
 Quantum thermodynamics
 Quantum statistical mechanics

References

Quantum field theory
Statistical mechanics